The Thurgood Marshall School of Law (TMSL) is an ABA-accredited law school in Houston, Texas, that awards Juris Doctor and Master of Law degrees. It is part of Texas Southern University. Thurgood Marshall School of Law is a member-school of the Thurgood Marshall College Fund and Association of American Law Schools.

History
The history of TMSL can be traced back to a 1946 lawsuit implicating protections for racial minorities under the U.S. Constitution, Sweatt v. Painter, brought by Heman M. Sweatt, and tried by Thurgood Marshall. The Texas Constitution mandated separate but equal facilities for whites and blacks. Mr. Sweatt was refused admission to the University of Texas School of Law because he was black. In order to pre-empt the possibility of Mr. Sweatt obtaining a successful court order, the legislature passed Texas State Senate Bill 140, which established a university to offer courses of higher learning in law, pharmacy, dentistry, journalism, education, arts and sciences, literature, medicine, and other professional courses. It opened in 1946 as the "Texas State University for Negroes," and later changed its name in Texas Southern University in 1951.

In 2016, TMSL began to offer a Master of Laws in Immigration and Naturalization Law.  The program is the first Masters of Law program in the nation to focus on immigration law.

In 2017, The American Bar Association (ABA) formally censured the school as "being out of compliance with its nondiscrimination standard as well as the standard that requires disclosure of information to the ABA. More specifically, an ABA site visit team found evidence of gender discrimination and sexual harassment at the law school" and was "required to establish a plan to eliminate gender discrimination and sex harassment." Months prior, the ABA had also "found Texas Southern (TMSL) out of compliance with the standards meant to ensure schools only admit students who appear capable of graduating and passing the bar." In 2020, the ABA concluded TMSL is in compliance with all accreditation standards.

For 2020, the law school is ranked No. 146-192, by U.S. News & World Report. Schools are ranked according to their performance across a set of widely accepted indicators of excellence.

Student Demographics and Bar Passage Rate

As of October, 2018, 56% of the student body was African-American, 5% Asian-American, 11% White, 26% Hispanic, and 2% Other.

Of the 1,406 students who applied to TMSL to start in fall 2018, 498 were accepted (for a 35.4% admission rate), and 43.5% of those offered admission enrolled, for a 43.5% yield.  These enrolled students had an average LSAT score of 144, and an average college GPA of 3.03.

For 2019 first time takers, TMSL students had a bar examination passage rate of 55.7%.

TMSL Library
The TMSL Library housed within the law school building has over 350,000 volumes and volume equivalents.  In 2010, the National Jurist ranked the TMSL Library 31st out of 198 law libraries in the nation for resources, service, and space.  TMSL also had the distinction of being the only Houston law school ranked, the only historically black law school ranked, and one of only two Texas law schools ranked.

TMSL Legal Clinics
Earl Carl Institute for Legal and Social Justice, Inc.: An institute dedicated to identifying potential implementable solutions to legal and social issues disproportionately impacting minority communities
Center for Legal Pedagogy: It serves as a study and creation center of instructional design for legal education
Institute for International and Immigration Law: An institute dedicated to providing specialized academic and practical legal training for students planning a career in international or immigration law

Publications
Thurgood Marshall Law Review - The law review was established in 1970 and is a legal research and writing forum for legal scholars and practitioners from around the world.
The Thurgood Marshall School of Law Gender, Race, and Justice Law Journal  - A student-run organization whose primary purpose is to publish a journal of legal scholarship.

Employment
According to Thurgood Marshall's official 2018 ABA-required disclosures, 45.30% of the Class of 2018 obtained full-time, long-term, JD-required employment nine months after graduation.

Costs
The total estimated cost of attendance (indicating the cost of tuition, fees, and living expenses) at Thurgood Marshall for the 2018-2019 academic year is $41,237 for residents and $48,437 for nonresidents.

Notable alumni
Notable graduates of TSML include the following:

Roberto R. Alonzo (J.D., 1984), Member of the Texas House of Representatives
Stephanie Flowers, Attorney and member of the Arkansas State Senate and former state representative from Pine Bluff, Arkansas
Sylvia Garcia, Former Member of the Texas Senate, 6th District (Houston) and U.S. Representative for Texas Congressional District 29
Al Green, (J.D., 1974), U.S. Representative for 9th Congressional District of Texas
Kenneth M. Hoyt,  Senior United States District Judge
Hank Johnson, (J.D. 1979), U.S. Representative for 4th Congressional District of Georgia
Harry E. Johnson, President and CEO of Martin Luther King, Jr. Memorial Project Memorial Foundation
Leslie D. King, Mississippi Supreme Court Justice
Chokwe Antar Lumumba (J.D. 2008), Mayor of Jackson, Mississippi, the largest city in the state
Colion Noir, Member of the National Rifle Association, lawyer and  gun rights activist.
 Morris Overstreet, First African-American elected to statewide office in Texas
 Belvin Perry (J.D., 1977), Chief judge in the Florida's Ninth Judicial Circuit, presiding judge for the high-profile Casey Anthony murder trial.
Senfronia Thompson, Member of the Texas House of Representatives
Craig Washington (J.D., 1969), Former U.S. Congressman, 18th District (Texas).
Brian C. Wimes, Federal judge

Notable faculty
Paul Womack, Former, Criminal Law, retiring judge of the Texas Court of Criminal Appeals

References

Texas Southern University
Law schools in Texas
Historically black law schools
Thurgood Marshall